The 2008 African Men's Handball Championship was the 18th edition of the African Men's Handball Championship, held in Angola, from 8 to 17 January 2008. It acted as the African qualifying tournament for the 2008 Summer Olympics in Beijing and the 2009 World Championship in Croatia.

Egypt win their fifth title beating Tunisia in the final game 27–25.

Venues

Qualified teams

Group stage
All times are local (UTC+1).

Group A

Group B

Knockout stage

5–8 place bracket

5–8th place bracket

Semifinals

Seventh place game

Fifth place game

Third place game

Final

Final ranking

References

African handball championships
Handball
A
Handball
Handball in Angola
20th century in Angola
January 2008 sports events in Africa